Circus of the Damned is a horror/mystery novel by American writer Laurell K. Hamilton, the third book in her Anita Blake: Vampire Hunter series. 
Within the novel, the "Circus of the Damned" is the name of a supernatural circus that operated by Jean-Claude and serves as one of the main locations within the book. Hamilton employed the practice of titling the novels after a location within each novel for most of the books in the series.

Plot introduction

Circus of the Damned continues the adventures of Anita Blake.  Anita simultaneously attempts to solve a series of murders by an unknown vampire pack, fend off the advances of her would be vampire master, Jean-Claude and deal with various people and creatures who wish her to reveal Jean-Claude's identity and location.  As with its predecessors, Circus of the Damned blends elements of supernatural, hardboiled detective, and police procedural fiction.

Characters

Major characters
Circus of the Damned features the following major characters.
 Anita Blake: Anita continues her progression, as she initially is willing to kill Jean-Claude rather than be marked as his human servant, but ultimately continues to accept her role as a bridge between the worlds of humans and monsters in order to save the city.  At the end of Circus of the Damned, Anita sees Jean-Claude as something more of a person and is willing to continue dating Richard, even though he is one of "the monsters." 
 Jean-Claude: Hamilton reveals a little more of Jean-Claude's character in this novel.  Jean-Claude's control over the city is apparently precarious, and, true to form, he attempts to use this very weakness to force Anita to surrender to him, showing his previously established manipulative, seductive, and somewhat ruthless nature.  In addition, Jean-Claude proves himself quite brave in his vastly overmatched battle against Mr. Oliver, and quite deeply attached to Anita when he does not attempt to kill her in revenge for her almost killing him, nor does he surrender his romantic pursuit.
 Richard Zeeman: A "nice guy" alternative to Jean-Claude's manipulative seduction, Richard's good looks and brown hair remind Anita of Phillip, the doomed stripper from Guilty Pleasures.  Richard's good looks, charm, and emotional vulnerability contributed to the love/hate relationship Anita developed with him over the next several novels.
 Mr Oliver:  Mr Oliver is the most threatening opponent Anita had faced to date, and possibly the most threatening ever.  By personifying her previous attitude that vampires were irredeemable monsters, Mr Oliver helped move Anita to some middle ground.
 Alejandro: An ancient vampire who is the first vampire to share all four marks with her, and thus the first to make her his full human servant, though she is by no means servant-like towards him. Because of his actions in this novel she is freed of Jean Claudes marks that she had gained in Guilty Pleasures.

Other characters
 Circus of the Damned featured reappearances from Anita's coworkers, Bert, and Ronnie, police officers Dolph and Zerbrowski, and recurring character John Burke
 The novel introduced recurring characters Larry Kirkland and Stephen.
 Non-recurring characters include: Jeremy Rubens, the leader of Humans Against Vampires, Karl Inger, the human servant of Mr Oliver, The first vampire to make her their full human servant Alejandro, Rashida, Melanie, and Marguerite, a beautiful but unstable blue eyed blonde who is Yasmeen's human servant and lover.  After Yasmeen was killed, Marguerite clawed her eyes out in grief.
 The death toll in Circus of the Damned includes: Calvin Rupert and Reba Baker, Humans Against Vampires members killed by Alejandro's pack; hospital guard Jimmy Dugan, an unnamed guard, an unnamed nurse and an unnamed vampire counsellor, killed by Rupert in an animalistic vampire state; Calvin Rupert, killed again as a vampire by Anita and John Burke; Raju, Ronald, and two unnamed men, all men ensorcelled by Melanie and killed by Anita; two unnamed snake creatures killed by Anita and Edward during the final battle; an unnamed child vampire and two unnamed women vampires, all members of Alejandro's pack and killed (probably by Edward) during the final battle; Yasmeen, killed by Alejandro, and Oliver and Alejandro both killed by Anita. 

Anita Blake: Vampire Hunter novels
1995 American novels
Low fantasy novels
Urban fantasy novels
Novels set in St. Louis
Ace Books books